The Delaware Center for Horticulture (DCH) cultivates greener communities by inspiring appreciation and improvement of the environment through horticulture, education and conservation. Founded in 1977, the Center's headquarters in Wilmington's Trolley Square is an oasis in the city. The venue hosts many weddings and corporate events and includes a public demonstration garden that backs up to Brandywine Park, an art gallery, lecture hall, and a greenhouse. The DCH plants thousands of trees and leads regional projects to enhance Delaware's urban forests; supports community gardens, urban farms, and school gardens; organizes city park improvement projects; beautifies Delaware's roadsides with native vegetation; maintains the landscaping of many traffic medians and streetscapes; and provides educational programs for families and adults. Members of The DCH and more than 700 active volunteers come from Delaware and the surrounding region.

Mission and focus 

The Delaware Center for Horticulture cultivates a greener community by inspiring appreciation and improvement of the environment through horticulture, education, and conservation. Their work is focused on making Delaware a beautiful, healthy place to live, work and play. Their mission is important as they help people incorporate trees, parks, and gardens into the urban environment.

Programs 

The work of The DCH includes community gardens, public landscaping, roadside beautification, tree programs, educational programs and community events.

City Gardens Contest 

Now in its 31st year, the Wilmington City Gardens Contest is a friendly competition open to all residents and businesses within the city limits. Winners are announced at the annual awards ceremony in September of each year.

Rare Plant Auction 

The Rare Plant Auction is the annual signature event for The DCH. The event is traditionally held at Longwood Gardens in late April of each year. All proceeds benefit the Community Greening Program at The DCH, which uses horticulture to improve the quality of life for residents in urban neighborhoods.

See also 

 Horticulture

References

External links 

Botanical gardens in Delaware
Non-profit organizations based in Delaware
1977 establishments in Delaware
Tourist attractions in Wilmington, Delaware
Protected areas of New Castle County, Delaware
Education in New Castle County, Delaware
Contexts for auctions